I'm a Woman is an album by Elisabeth Andreasson, released in November 1983. The album sold circa 30,000 copies in Sweden, which as of 2006 corresponded to a golden record.

Track listing

Side A
"Sommarreggae (Sunshine Reggae)"
"Om jag lyssnar"
"Gå nu"
"Stjärnhimmel"
"Stanna"
"Operator"

Side B
"I'm a Woman"
"Du värmer mig"
"Jag vågar tala om"
"Håll mig hårt" (duet with Jan Andreasson)
"Drömmer om dig i natt"
"Se på mig jag flyger"

References 

1983 albums
Elisabeth Andreassen albums